Professor John Richard Ockendon FRS (born c. 1940) is an applied mathematician noted especially for his contribution to fluid dynamics and novel applications of mathematics to real world problems.  He is a professor at the University of Oxford and an Emeritus Fellow at St Catherine's College, Oxford, the first director of the Oxford Centre for Collaborative Applied Mathematics (OCCAM) and a former director of the Smith Institute for Industrial Mathematics and System Engineering.

Education
Ockendon was educated at the University of Oxford where he was awarded a Doctor of Philosophy degree in 1965 for research on fluid dynamics supervised by Alan B Tayler.

Research and career
His initial fluid mechanics interests included hypersonic aerodynamics, creeping flow, sloshing and channel flows and leading to flows in porous media, ship hydrodynamics and models for flow separation.

He moved on to free and moving boundary problems. He pioneered the study of diffusion-controlled moving boundary problems in the  1970s his involvement centring  on models for phase changes and elastic contact problems all built around the paradigm of the Hele-Shaw free boundary problem. Other industrial collaboration has led to new ideas for lens design, fibre manufacture, extensional and surface-tension- driven flows and glass manufacture, fluidised-bed models, semiconductor device modelling and a range of other problems in mechanics and heat and mass transfer, especially scattering and ray theory, nonlinear wave propagation, nonlinear oscillations, nonlinear diffusion and impact in solids and liquids.

His efforts to promote mathematical collaboration with industry led him to organise annual meetings of the Study Groups with Industry from 1972 to 1989.

Awards and honours
He was elected Fellow of the Royal Society in 1999, and awarded the Gold Medal of the Institute of Mathematics and its Applications in 2006.

Personal life
Ockendon is married to coauthor and colleague Hilary Ockendon.
In Who's Who he lists his recreations as mathematical modelling, bird watching, Hornby-Dublo model trains and old sports cars.

References

Fellows of the Royal Society
Living people
1940s births
20th-century British mathematicians
21st-century British mathematicians
Fellows of the Society for Industrial and Applied Mathematics
Fellows of St Catherine's College, Oxford
Fluid dynamicists